The Ledyard Bank Classic (formerly the Auld Lang Syne Classic) is a college Division I men's ice hockey tournament played before New Years at the Thompson Arena in Hanover, New Hampshire, the home arena for Dartmouth College.

The tournament was first held in 1978 and was usually played on the final two days of December every year until 1988. Since then it was played infrequently (though with no more than a two-year gap between events) until 2008 when it returned to an annual schedule which it continues to possess. In 2002 the holiday tournament changed its name from 'Auld Lang Syne' to 'Ledyard Bank' due to sponsorship.

The 2016 tournament featured a predetermined schedule, as opposed to an elimination format, which prevented a traditional championship game. Winner and placement as determined by record, as UMass Lowell's two regulation wins secured a title over Dartmouth's one win and one shootout win. Army secured third place with a regulation win and shootout loss, and Colgate finished fourth with two regulation losses. 

Due to the COVID-19 pandemic, the tournament was not held in 2020. In 2021, the tournament returned to an elimination schedule, with Day 1's respective winning and losing teams facing each other the next day.

Yearly results

Team records

References

College ice hockey tournaments in the United States
College sports in New Hampshire
Dartmouth Big Green ice hockey
Ice hockey in New Hampshire
Sports competitions in New Hampshire